Tropang LOL, is a Philippine late-morning variety show broadcast by TV5, Kapamilya Channel and A2Z which premiered on October 19, 2020. The program airs live every Mondays to Saturdays from 11:00 AM to 12:45 PM. It is currently presented by notable ABS-CBN talents and social media influencers, namely Billy Crawford, Alex Gonzaga, Bayani Agbayani, Wacky Kiray, Alexa Miro, KC Montero, Jeff Tam, Jd Axie, Laboching and Matteo Guidicelli. Tropang LOL is one of the numerous programs produced by Brightlight Productions, the production outfit of former Rep. Albee Benitez, and is produced  by veteran television director and former Star Magic head Johnny Manahan.

Overview
 The show was first known as Lunch Out Loud which premiered on October 19, 2020, as a regular daily noontime variety show.  The encore episodes were subsequently aired on Cignal TV's cable channel Colours TV until the said cable channel closed down on December 31, 2021. The original hosts include Billy Crawford, Alex Gonzaga, Bayani Agbayani, K Brosas, Wacky Kiray, Ariel Rivera, KC Montero, Francoise "Laboching" Faisan, Mark Averilla (also known as Macoy Dubs) and Jeff Tam. The show marks the return of Gonzaga and Agbayani to TV5.

On July 16, 2022, Lunch Out Loud was reformatted with a new title Tropang LOL and began its simulcast over Kapamilya Channel, Kapamilya Online Live and A2Z. It was moved to an earlier timeslot at 11:00 AM as a preprogramming to It's Showtime as part of their back-to-back collaboration. The show is also available in IWantTFC and TFC.

Cast

Main hosts 
 Billy Crawford 
 Alex Gonzaga 
 Bayani Agbayani 
 Wacky Kiray 
 KC Montero 
 Jeffrey Tam 
 Francoise Denyse Fainsan  "Laboching" 
 JD Axie 
 Alexa Miro 
 Matteo Guidicelli

Other cast members 
 LOL Babes 
 LOL Boys 
 Jacob Plaza  
 Mark Michael Garcia

Regular guest co-hosts 
 Isabelle Daza

Former guest co-hosts 
Gelli de Belen 
Valerie Concepcion 
Kim Molina 
Claudine Barretto

Former cast 
 Ariel Rivera 
 Mark Averilla (also known as Macoy Dubs / Auntie Julie) 
 Querubin Gonzales 
 Nick Parker 
 Nikka Brillantes 
 K Brosas

Former cast members 
 Grace Cristobal (also known as "Amazing Grace") 
 DJ Arra Pascual

Segments

Current

Pera-Usog 
The segment is divided into two parts: the elimination round and the jackpot round.

In the elimination round dubbed as Usog Presyo, similar to the various games of The Price Is Right, three contestants will bid on a prize of every item presented, and the player who bids closest to the actual retail price of that prize will move into the next platform, whoever bids the exact amount of the retail price he will get the item and will move as well to the next platform. The player who wins thrice will advance to the Jackpot Round.

In the jackpot round, the winning contestant of the elimination round will arrange the six items in order to come up with the pot money that he/she may bring home. The hosts will do a skit and present six items, each of which contains the number representing the amount of  &  a brand new Suzuki Spresso KIA Stonic car. The host makes a "sure win" showcase offer that would make the player think if he'll go through with the game (Pera Usog), rearrange the items or withdraw with the offer (Sure Win).

Sagot Mo, Sagot Ko
Hosted by "Daddy Bills" Billy Crawford, "Sagot Mo, Sagot Ko" is an exciting game segment for a lucky home viewer for the day. Crawford will draw a phone number of a lucky home viewer that he will call. The winner then shares his life story to the hosts, such as family, occupation, love life, health, and financial status. Throughout the interview, the hosts comically makes funny remarks to keep the conversation lighthearted and entertaining. The winner may request Billy to pay for whatever he/she wishes for.

Beat The Who 
A counterpart of Beat the 2, the hosts will compete against a group of people. The host will select a group members' name from a fishbowl; then the selected member will select a host of their choice. There are various games that will be played: it depends on the  mechanics described by the host before the first round begins.

The winning player will receive five hundred pesos (₱500) [if the host wins, the host will win nothing]. The losing player will be punished by the Punisher by smothering him or her with cream.

At the end of the segment, the hosts will pick a prize ball ranging from two thousand five hundred pesos (₱2,500) to ten thousand pesos (₱10,000). Then, they will select a name from a bowl. The selected name will receive the cash chosen by the host earlier.

H.O.P.E. 
H.O.P.E (Hindi, Oo, Pwede, Ewan) is a reality dating game segment for ex-couples. The segment aims to give chance or closure for ex-couples. The two guests will read their letters for each other, and will ask each other seven answers of hope. At the end of the segment, the couple will ultimately decide If there will be a chance (Oo/Pwede) or Not (Hindi/Ewan).

Maritest 
A game segment hosted by Billy Crawford in which a contestant answers to showbiz-related questions. The game is inspired by the British game show, Who Wants to be a Millionaire?. The game has 10 levels, each with increased difficulty with higher cash (in order: 5,000, 10,000, 15,000, 20,000, 25,000, 30,000, 35,000, 40,000, 50,000, and 75,000 Philippine pesos). The contestant would be given a question and the choices. If the contestant finds it hard to answer, the host would advise the contestant to use three Chikalalays (portmanteau of "chika (gossip) and alalay (aid)" that can only be used once (similar to the Three Lifelines of the British Format). The Chikalalays are: "Hanash ng mga Manash" (based on Ask The Audience), in which the Tropang LOL would give their answer in majority, "Call a Sismosa" (based on Phone a Friend), in which the contestant would call one of his/her peers to answer a question for one minute, and "Say ni Marites" (based on Ask the Expert), in which the contestant would choose one of the Tropang LOL to answer a certain question.

The segment host would also give a "Chikash" (a portmanteau of "chika" and "cash" , a mock on GCash) offer to end the game and take the cash from the previous level, the game continues when the contestant says "Push!". However, the host would no longer offer Chikash if the contestant reaches the final level.

At the final level, the contestant are no longer given choices and should specifically answer the question. If the contestant gives the exact answer, the contestant would be given the jackpot prize of P75,000.

Matteo Guidicelli, Alex Gonzaga and Wacky Kiray have been hosting this segment interchangeably.

Seasonal
Ca-LOL-ing 
A Christmas Caroling segment.

Defunct/On-hiatus
BUWAYArtista
In BUWAYArtista, two contestants will compete to impress the "Artistagators" who are all portrayed by hosts. The contestant who wins, called the "Artistahin" has a chance to have a Buhay Artista at the grand finals, whereas the other is called the "Artis-kain" and is given for a fake crocodile (buwaya) called "Crocky" to "eat." The title is a portmanteau of Buwaya, Filipino for crocodile, and artista, Filipino for artist.

Drag Queendom
A Drag Race inspired show featuring 9 queen organized into 3 "Queendoms" Lip-synching onto different songs.

KanTrabaho
"Kantrabaho," is a singing contest for each from different fields of career will be given their to shine on stage.

Dubbed as Boss-SINGS, the celebrity judges will be Ariel Rivera, K Brosas, and Wacky Kiray. Seated on revolving chairs, the Boss-SINGS will press a button that will automatically make them turn their back on the contestants they want to eliminate. The mic of the contestants will also be automatically muted.

Color Game
The televiewers also have a chance to win prizes via the "Color Game."

All they have to do is predict the seven colors that the hosts will highlight during different portions in the noontime show. At the end of each episode, viewers can send their answers—the seven colors featured for the day—by commenting on the show's Facebook Live session. The first televiewer to comment the right answer wins the game.

Quiz Universe
"Quiz Universe" is a beauty pageant with a twist.

Three female contestants representing their respective schools or barangays will compete for a chance to win by undergoing three challenges. They will be tasked to create their own "national costume"; create a fashionable PPE outfit; and ace the Q&A portion.

 Dance Entertainment

A dance battle contest that was a tribute to the defunct GMA-7 program That's Entertainment and "Master Showman" himself, German Moreno. Hosted by Billy Crawford dubbed as the Dance Master Showman. Each episode, two contestants ("Taga-Dance") will perform their dancing skills. The winning contestant will choose the group they want to join after hearing the sales pitch of the Dance Leaders. The dancing contest, convincing and selecting will continue until each leader has their three winning contestants.

 Tao Ibon
On November 30, 2021, Tao Ibon Launches The Segments Over 15 Studio Audience Kazoom Bahay Catches The Ball Flip The Chip Like A Tao (People) & Ibon (Bird) Team Players Will Win In  Pauga.

 Beat The 2
Hosts guess the translation or the opposite meaning of the given word by Billy Crawford in just two beats.

Accolades

See also
 List of programs broadcast by TV5 (Philippine TV network)
 Kapatid Channel
 Philippine noontime variety television shows

References

External links

Filipino-language television shows
TV5 (Philippine TV network) original programming
Philippine game shows
2020 Philippine television series debuts
Television series by Brightlight Productions